Bikash Bharati Law College is a college imparting education in law in Kolkata, West Bengal. It was established in the year 2006 and offers a five-year integrated Bachelor of Law (B.A./LL.B) degree. The college is affiliated to  University of Calcutta.

See also 
List of colleges affiliated to the University of Calcutta
Education in India
Education in West Bengal

References

External links
Bikash Bharati Law College

University of Calcutta affiliates
Law schools in West Bengal
Universities and colleges in South 24 Parganas district
Educational institutions established in 2006
2006 establishments in West Bengal